The Mollycoddle is a 1920 American film starring Douglas Fairbanks and Wallace Beery, and directed by Victor Fleming. Beery plays an ice-cold villain brawling with Fairbanks' character all the way down the side of a steep mountain in one sequence. A copy of the film is in the Museum of Modern Art and in other film collections.

Plot
As described in a film magazine, Richard Marshall (Fairbanks), nicknamed The Mollycoddle by his friends, is the descendant of hard-hitting, fearless western stock, and although born in Arizona he has been raised since a child in England and acquired English ways. Upon meeting some Americans who are about to go home in a private yacht, he joins them. Fearing that Richard is a secret service operative, the owner of the yacht, who is smuggling diamonds into the United States, withdraws the invitation. Friends, however, smuggle him aboard and, when the owner discovers him, he is put to work shoveling coal in the boiler room. Off the coast of Texas he jumps ship and swims ashore, is picked up by a fishing net and eventually makes his way to Arizona, where the party is exploring the diamond mines. Richard discovers the plot to blow up a mountain and hem the party in a little valley. The scheme nearly succeeds, but Richard captures the smuggler in a tall tree, falls through the tree limbs and brawls with him down an extremely steep embankment into a river and over a falls, then drags the half-drowned man to shore. In addition, he of course wins the girl, who turns out to be a detective in service to Uncle Sam.

Cast (in credits order)
 Douglas Fairbanks as Richard Marshall III, IV and V
 Ruth Renick as Virginia Hale
 Wallace Beery as Henry von Holkar
 Paul Burns as Samuel Levinski
 Morris Hughes as Patrick O'Flannigan
 George Stewart as Ole Olsen
 Charles Stevens as Yellow Horse
 Lewis Hippe as First Mate
 Betty Bouton as Mollie Warren
 Adele Farrington as Mrs. Warren
 Albert MacQuarrie as Driver of the Desert Yacht
 Freddie Hawk as Girl Hobo

Uncredited cast
 Bob Burns as Barfly (uncredited)
 Frank Campeau as Man at Trading Post (uncredited)
 Eagle Eye as Chief (uncredited)
 Bull Montana as Cannery Worker (uncredited)

Production crew
 Cinematography by William C. McGann and Harris Thorpe
 Art Direction by Edward M. Langley
 Second Unit Director Theodore Reed
 Technical effects by Robert Fairbanks
 Supervisor - Douglas Fairbanks

References

External links 

 
 Synopsis of The Mollycoddle
 Glass slide at silenthollywood.com

1920 films
American silent feature films
American black-and-white films
Films directed by Victor Fleming
1920 romantic comedy films
1920 adventure films
American adventure films
American romantic comedy films
1920s American films
Silent romantic comedy films
Silent adventure films
Silent American comedy films